Eugenia Yurevna Vanina (born 24 December 1957) is a Russian Indologist, head of the History and Culture section and a researcher in the Centre for Indian Studies at the Institute of Oriental Studies of the Russian Academy of Sciences. She is known for her analyses of textual material from north and central India, and her studies of historical processes.

Life
Eugenia Vanina studied at the University of Delhi between 1979–80, training in Hindi and Sanskrit. She defended her Candidate of Sciences thesis, titled Urban handicraft production in North India, 16th-18th centuries in 1984 at the Institute of Asian and African Countries, Moscow State University. She obtained her higher doctoral degree of Doktor nauk in 2006 with her dissertation titled Medieval Indian Mindscapes: Space, Time, Society, Man.

Career
Vanina's 1996 publication of Ideas and Society in India from the Sixteenth to the Eighteenth Centuries (an English language translation of her Russian volume from 1993) restricted the notion of 'medieval India' to the period between Akbar and the end of the Mughal Empire, and was a comparative analysis of trends in Western Europe and India. She introduced her idea of social processes and noted that these drove society from feudalism to capitalism via new forms of authoritarianism. She compared the bhakti and sufi tradition in India with the European reformation. The latter, she claimed, led to the abolition of feudalism, while the former, among other processes, led to the same in India only in the 19th century. These processes were, for example, the centralising worldly power of the Mughal emperor versus religious law.  Critics called her concept of social processes as 'nebulous', while the lack of attention to Timurid forms of governance and the concentration on Hindu traditions of rulership was also criticised.

In her work titled Medieval Indian Mindscapes: Space, Time, Society, Man, Vanina stated that Marxist analyses concentrated on the socio-economic, ignoring the material and spiritual. To remedy the lacuna, Vanina applied social and cultural categories that implied that India between the 1st to the 18th centuries was feudal. Her comparison of the Indian worldview with that of the European suggested that both sets of societies underwent the same 'mental programme'. Her synthesis of the entire cultural development of medieval India as equivalent to 'feudal', however, was questioned by some critics, and her application of the Marxist notion of base and superstructure was criticised. Meanwhile, other critics claimed that her proposed model of studying spaces as sacred places, cyclical time, hierarchical social estates, and the opposition of the individual versus society, is not coherent enough to establish her claimed similarity with Western feudalism. Vanina analysed the notion of 'feudalism' as applied to India, on the one hand rejecting it as insufficient from a historiographical perspective, while on the other, inferring from her overarching definition of 'man' and 'society' as essentially on par with feudalism. Critics nevertheless appreciated the insights drawn from her close readings from medieval texts, albeit with the caveat of their restriction to north and central India, and the lack of female voices.

Selected works

Articles

Books

References 

Living people
1957 births
Russian Indologists
20th-century Russian historians
Academic staff of the Moscow State Institute of International Relations
21st-century Russian historians